The National Shrine of St. John Neumann is a Roman Catholic National shrine dedicated to St. John Neumann, the fourth Bishop of Philadelphia and the first American male to be canonized. The shrine is located in the lower church of St. Peter the Apostle Church at 1019 North 5th Street, in Philadelphia, Pennsylvania, in the United States. The construction of the main church began in 1843.

Adjoining the lower church is a small museum, which displays exhibits relating to the life of the saint.  The National Shrine of St. John Neumann and St. Peter's Church are under the care of the Redemptorists, the religious community of which St. John Neumann was a member.

History

When Bishop Neumann died suddenly in 1860 he was buried, as requested, at St. Peter's Church beneath the undercroft floor directly below the high altar.

Pope Paul VI beatified Neumann during the Second Vatican Council and declared him a saint in 1977.  The undercroft at St. Peter the Apostle Church underwent several renovations after Neumann's initial interment.  The space served for years as the lower church of St. Peter the Apostle parish and eventually became the National Shrine of Saint John Neumann after his canonization.  The body of the saint lies in a glass-enclosed reliquary under the main altar.  It is dressed in the episcopal vestments with a mask covering the face.

The saint's body has undergone multiple vestment changes since it was first displayed at the time of his beatification.  In 1989, during the course of a major renovation of the shrine, the body of the saint was clothed in a set of modern vestments cut in the Gothic style.  On December 27, 2007, the body received a new mask and was clad with a set of traditional Roman vestments, including a laced alb, stole, maniple, episcopal gloves, and traditional Roman fiddleback chasuble.  The Cardinal Archbishop of Philadelphia, Justin Francis Rigali, was present to assist with the vesting.

Fire
Fire broke out in the lower church on May 13, 2009. The pulpit, located near the body, was reduced to ashes, but the body of the saint was left intact. The plaster covering over the face did not show any signs of heat. The pastor, Fr. Kevin Moley, C.Ss.R., called it miraculous.

See also

List of shrines#United States
Top eight Catholic pilgrimage destinations in the US
Archdiocese of Philadelphia

References

External links

National Shrine of Saint John Neumann official website
National Shrine of St. John Neumann Facebook Page
Redemptorists of the Baltimore Province: St. John Neumann
St. Peter the Apostle Church website

Roman Catholic national shrines in the United States
Roman Catholic Archdiocese of Philadelphia
Redemptorist churches in the United States
Roman Catholic churches in Pennsylvania
Roman Catholic churches in Philadelphia
Museums in Philadelphia
Religious museums in Pennsylvania
Biographical museums in Pennsylvania
Northern Liberties, Philadelphia